Dijkstra ( or ) is a Dutch family name of West Frisian origin.
It most commonly refers to:
 Edsger W. Dijkstra (1930–2002), Dutch computer scientist
 Named after him: Dijkstra's algorithm, Dijkstra Prize, Dijkstra–Scholten algorithm

Dijkstra may also refer to:

People
 Bram Dijkstra (born 1938), American professor of English literature and cultural historian
 Jan Dijkstra (1910–1993), Dutch mayor
  (1896–1978), Dutch painter, illustrator and stained glass artist
 Lenie Dijkstra (born 1967), Dutch racing cyclist
 Lou Dijkstra (1909-1964), Dutch speed skater, father of Sjoukje Dijkstra
 Margaret Dijkstra, pseudonym of Eva Gerlach (born 1948), Dutch poet
 Marjolein Dijkstra (born 1967), Dutch physicist
 Mart Dijkstra (born 1990), Dutch footballer
 Meindert Dijkstra (born 1967), Dutch footballer
 Peter Dijkstra (born 1978), Dutch choir conductor
 Pia Dijkstra (born 1954), Dutch politician and television presenter
 Remco Dijkstra (born 1972), Dutch politician
 Rineke Dijkstra (born 1959), Dutch photographer
 Sieb Dijkstra (born 1966), Dutch football goalkeeper
 Sjoukje Dijkstra (born 1942), Dutch figure skater
 Wieke Dijkstra (born 1984), Dutch field hockey player

Fictional characters
 Roel Dijkstra, eponymous character in a comic book series published from 1977 to 1995
 Sigismund Dijkstra, character from Andrzej Sapkowski's The Witcher saga and the third Witcher game
 Kenny Dykstra a Wrestler played by Kenneth George Doane in The WWE and was a member of the Spirit Squad

References

Dutch-language surnames
Surnames of Frisian origin